WarioWare, Inc.: Mega Microgames!, stylized as WarioWare, Inc.: Mega Microgame$! and known as WarioWare, Inc.: Minigame Mania in the PAL regions, is a minigame compilation video game developed by Nintendo R&D1 and published by Nintendo for the Game Boy Advance. The debut title in the WarioWare series, the game is about rapid completion of "microgames", short minigames given to the player consecutively and with increasing speed per each game complete. The game's concept was inspired by the "Sound Bomber" mode of Mario Artist: Polygon Studio for the Nintendo 64DD. The music and sound effects (including Wario's voice clips) were recycled from Wario Land 4. The game was produced by Takehiro Izushi and directed by Hirofumi Matsuoka. Matsuoka was also the director of Polygon Studio. Mega Microgames! was released in 2003; in Japan in March, in North America and Europe in May and in Australia in June.

Upon its release, WarioWare, Inc.: Mega Microgames! received critical acclaim, winning GameSpots Editor's Choice Award and Most Innovative Game Award of 2003, among other awards. It is also revered as one of the greatest games of all time. The game went on to receive a multiplayer-focused remake called WarioWare, Inc.: Mega Party Games! on the GameCube. The game went on to spawn the WarioWare series of video games, which all have the same formula of gameplay as the debut title, with the exception of Game & Wario. "Pyoro" and "Paper Plane", two bonus minigames that appear in Mega Microgames!, were reworked into two full titles for the DSiWare service as Bird & Beans and Paper Airplane Chase, respectively. In addition, some of the microgames featured in Mega Microgames! also return in the ninth installment, WarioWare Gold. The game has also been re-released through the Virtual Console on Wii U, the Ambassador Program on Nintendo 3DS and on the Nintendo Switch Online + Expansion Pack.

Gameplay 

WarioWare's core gameplay principles revolve around the concept of "microgames", minigames that must be completed within a demanding time limit. In a stage, microgames are presented to the player consecutively, and as the player keeps playing, the game speeds up, making microgames' time limits shorter and forcing the player to complete them faster. If the player completes a microgame, the game moves onto the next one, while if the player fails a microgame, by either losing the game or running out of time, one of four lives will be deducted. If the player loses all four of their lives, the game will end and the player's score (the number of microgames played) will be saved if it is one of their best three scores.

At the end of a set number of microgames, the player must complete a "boss stage"; a longer microgame without a set time limit. In these microgames, the player has the opportunity to gain an extra life, but only if the player has less than four lives. Mega Microgames! has nine stages, each revolving around Wario or one of his associates in a plot scenario. Each stage also has a general theme the microgames present in it pertain to, such as "Sports" or "Nintendo Classics". In addition to microgames, the player is also able to gain access to additional bonus minigames to play.

Mega Microgames! contains 213 microgames, split over 9 stages, each with different themes and following the story of different characters, all associates of Wario whom are contacted by him to make games for him to sell as part of his new "game" company. The game's story is conveyed through short subtitled cutscenes before and after stages. In addition to microgame stages, the player can unlock "remix" stages which feature microgames from past stages in it, as well as other bonus stages, which feature all microgames, but change elements like speed or microgame difficulty.

The player is also able to gain access to other bonus minigames if they beat or get a high score in certain main stages. The minigames are typically variations on concepts of existing microgames from main stages, and take the form of both single-player games and multiplayer games.

Development and release 

WarioWares inception began during the development of Mario Artist: Polygon Studio, a successor to Mario Paint being developed for the Nintendo 64DD; a game where players could create and animate fully polygonal three-dimensional models. A feature of Polygon Studio was a mode called "Sound Bomber", where the player completes rapid consecutive "microgames". This concept would be reused and fleshed out for the first WarioWare title. In addition, many of the minigames in Polygon Studio bear heavy resemblance to some microgames found in Mega Microgames!.

The development team used post-it notes in order to come up with microgame ideas; whenever someone had an idea for a microgame, they would write it down on a note and stick it to the director's table. The game became well known around the department, as other members not actively working on the game contributed ideas of their own in the hopes that the development team would be receptive. Microgames that were too obscene or "too Japanese" were cut to make sure all people playing could understand the game. As individual programmers coded individual microgames, each microgame has a vastly different visual style.

Made in Wario, as the game is known in Japan, was originally made secretly by a number of developers on the development team Nintendo R&D1 without telling their manager at the time. The people came up with the idea of using Wario as its mascot since they could not think of anyone else who would best be suited for the game. According to Yoshio Sakamoto, Wario was chosen as the game's protagonist as he "is always doing stupid things and is really idiotic".

Shigeru Miyamoto put a lot of thought into how best to market the game. He wanted to show how its unusual playing style made it distinct from other games, in the way it could be simply picked up and enjoyed. Miyamoto gave the staff the approval to use the slogan "More! Shorter! Faster!" (最多 最短 最速 Saita Saitan Saisoku), which prominently appeared on the Japanese box art, surpassing the actual game logo in terms of size. It was not used for Western packaging, which instead depicted the WarioWare cast rather than just a portion of Wario's face as seen on the Japanese counterpart.

 Reception 

Mega Microgames! has won numerous awards and received critical acclaim.  It was voted the winner of the Edge Award at the Edinburgh International Games Festival in 2004 by a panel of videogames industry members, academics, and journalists.

At GameSpot, it was awarded the Editor's Choice Award, "Game Boy Advance Game of the Month" prize and was nominated for its "Best and Worst" of 2003 in the "Most Innovative Game" category.

Reviewers wrote enthusiastically about the game. Jeff Gerstmann from GameSpot gave it a 9.1 out of 10 and praised the game for its portability, being able to play it in "short bursts" and being able to return to it again and again. Craig Harris from IGN said that the sheer number of minigames, its simplicity, and replay value made the game original and great, and gave it a 9.0.

Edge ranked the game #40 on its list of "The 100 Best Games To Play Today", stating "almost every minigame is a masterclass in how to instantly captivate with clear goals and a captivating alchemy of sound, image and control." The game was ranked 138th in Electronic Gaming Monthlys “The Greatest 200 Video Games of Their Time” in 2006. Official Nintendo Magazine ranked the game 78th on a list of greatest Nintendo games.

 Remakes and re-releases 

WarioWare, Inc.: Mega Party Games!

Mega Microgames! was remade for the GameCube as WarioWare, Inc.: Mega Party Games!, as a more multiplayer focused game than the original. The game features all of the same microgames as the Game Boy Advance version, but the microgames are set up in competitive environments for two to four players rather than an environment for one player.

 DSiWare 

Two unlockable minigames from this title, Paper Plane and Pyoro, have been released for the Nintendo DSi's DSiWare digital distribution service.

 Paper Airplane Chase 
, known in Europe and Australasia as Paper Plane, was released in Japan on December 24, 2008, in Europe and Australasia on April 3, 2009, and in North America on April 27 during the same year. The game plays the same as in its original title. There are three modes – the first is Endless, which places the player in a randomly generated course, requiring him or her to guide a paper airplane through it as it descends, attempting to get as far down as possible; Time Attack, which places the player in pre-created tracks, requiring them to get down to a certain point as fast as possible; and Race Mode, a two-player competition that is played on one DSi, with one player using the d-pad and the other using the face buttons. There are a total of eight courses in the game.

 Bird & Beans 
, known in PAL regions as Pyoro''', features both Pyoro and Pyoro 2 from the original GBA version. Both play mostly the same as the original versions, although the play area is now wider. The first requires the player to eat falling beans by shooting Pyoro's tongue in an upward diagonal direction. If a bean lands on the ground, it destroys part of the floor, limiting how much the player can move Pyoro. If the player eats a differently colored bean, it will restore one of the blocks, and eating a flashing bean restores many, if not all, lost blocks and destroys all on-screen beans. The further Pyoro's tongue is extended, the more points are awarded. If a seed lands on Pyoro, the game ends. In the second game, the player must shoot seeds at the falling beans. More points are awarded when two or more are taken out at the same time. Bird & Beans does not have any additional modes.

 Virtual Console 
In December 2011, Mega Microgames!'' and nine other Game Boy Advance games were released to Nintendo 3DS Ambassadors, who were early adopters that purchased and registered their 3DS systems prior to the console's first major price cut in their home markets.

The game was later released on the Wii U Virtual Console on April 3, 2014, in Japan and April 10, 2014, in North America and Europe.

In 2023, the game was re-released on the Nintendo Switch as part of the Game Boy Advance collection available through the Nintendo Switch Online Expansion Pack.

Notes

References 
 Text in this article was copied from WarioWare, Inc.: Mega Microgame$! at the Super Mario Wiki, which is released under a Creative Commons Attribution-Share Alike 3.0 (Unported) (CC-BY-SA 3.0) license.

External links 
Official website (in Japanese)

Japanese web site for Bird & Beans
Japanese web site for Paper Plane

2003 video games
Game Boy Advance games
DSiWare games
Nintendo Research & Development 1 games
Nintendo Switch Online games
Video games developed in Japan
Video games about video games
Virtual Console games
Virtual Console games for Nintendo 3DS
Virtual Console games for Wii U
WarioWare
Party video games
Multiplayer and single-player video games
Action video games
Minigame compilations

de:WarioWare#WarioWare, Inc.: Minigame Mania